"Birth in Reverse" is a song written and performed by St. Vincent, issued as the lead single from her fourth album, St. Vincent. A music video was released on December 16, 2014. On , St. Vincent performed the song on the season finale of Saturday Night Live.

Music video
The music video for "Birth in Reverse" was directed by Willo Perron, who was also the creative director for artwork surrounding St. Vincent. The video shows Annie Clark dancing and playing guitar along to the song against a starry background.

Critical reception
The song has received positive reviews from critics. Devon Maloney of Pitchfork called the song "vibrant", while Robin Smith of PopMatters commented that the song was "meant to be understood" and complimented the song's "space-fabric-ripping guitar". "Birth in Reverse" placed 56th on The Village Voices 2014 Pazz & Jop critics' poll.

Track listing

7" vinyl

Digital download

References

2013 songs
2013 singles
Republic Records singles
St. Vincent (musician) songs
Songs written by St. Vincent (musician)
Song recordings produced by John Congleton